The following highways are numbered 392:

Brazil
 BR-392

Canada
Manitoba Provincial Road 392
Newfoundland and Labrador Route 392

Japan
 Japan National Route 392

United Kingdom

United States
  Arkansas Highway 392
 Arkansas Highway 392 (former)
  Colorado State Highway 392
  Florida State Road 392A
  Maryland Route 392
 New York:
  New York State Route 392
 New York State Route 392 (former)
  County Route 392 (Erie County, New York)
  Pennsylvania Route 392
  Puerto Rico Highway 392
  South Carolina Highway 392
  Tennessee State Route 392
  Virginia State Route 392